Sahana Bajracharya is a Nepalese model, TV anchor, actress and media personality. She was crowned as Miss Nepal Earth 2010. She was also the host of Mega Model Season 2, the local version of America's Next Top Model . She was the first woman to be on TNM Magazine. She was recently featured in Ruslan Vodka's advertisement. She was host in another show named Namaste TV show which was shown in NTV plus

Biography
Sahana Bajracharya was born on 15 August 1989 in Kathmandu, Nepal. She did her education from St. Mary's School, Jawlakhel, Lalitpur and college through Weigan and Leigh College.

Career
Bajracharya became a media personality hosting TV shows such as Mega Model season 2, Yugantar and worked for Image Channel. In 2008, she competed in Miss Nepal 2008, but the pageant was later called off after protests from the female maoists. Sahana had also been hand picked to represent Nepal in the Miss Supertalent of the World 2011 beauty pageant which was held in Korea in October where she was amongst the top 15.

She was crowned Miss Nepal Earth 2010 on 1 September 2010 and later competed in Miss Earth 2010 on 4 December 2010. She later joined Kantipur Television Network and hosted TV show frame by frame which featured movie news and gossips. After getting fired from the Kantipur Television Network she started hosting another show Namaste TV show for Nepal Television network.

Filmography

References

1989 births
Living people
People from Kathmandu
Miss Nepal winners
Miss Earth 2010 contestants
Nepalese female models
Nepalese beauty pageant winners